Arnold Yembi (born 11 November 1984) is a retired Gabonese football striker.

References

1984 births
Living people
Gabonese footballers
Gabon international footballers
USM Libreville players
US Bitam players
Cercle Mbéri Sportif players
Association football forwards
21st-century Gabonese people